Cork Western Road railway station was a terminus station on the Cork and Muskerry Light Railway in County Cork, Ireland. The station was 
located at Lancaster Quay (the Bishop's Marsh) on the Western Road, close to what is now the River Lee Hotel in Cork city.

History

The station opened on 8 August 1887.

Passenger services were withdrawn on 31 December 1934.

Routes

Further reading

References

Disused railway stations in County Cork
Railway stations opened in 1887
Railway stations closed in 1934